Tây Hòa is a rural district (huyện) of Phú Yên province in the South Central Coastal region of Vietnam.

References

Districts of Phú Yên province